Hope Township is a civil township of Barry County in the U.S. state of Michigan. The population was 3,239 at the 2010 census.

History
The area around Hope, especially along the Cedar Creek, was a center of Protestant missionary work among the Potomatami in the 1830s and 1840s. Hope was organized as a township in 1850.

Communities
Cedar Creek is a locale in the southeast part of the township at  In 1849, Isaac LaGrange built the first sawmill in the township on the Cedar Creek. A post office named Cedar Creek was established in 1850, with LaGrange as the first postmaster. The office was permanently closed in December 1904.
Cloverdale is an unincorporated community within the township on Long Lake served by a U.S. post office with a ZIP code of 49035.
It was a station on the Chicago, Kalamazoo and Saginaw Railway. A post office operated from November 24, 1888, until July 31, 1933.

Geography

Demographics
As of the census of 2000, there were 3,283 people, 1,252 households, and 942 families residing in the township. The racial makeup of the township was 97.41% white, 0.24% African American, 0.76% Native American, 0.15% Asian, 0.27% from other races, and 1.16% from two or more races. Hispanic or Latino of any race were 1.16% of the population.

There were 1,252 households, out of which 32.6% had children under the age of 18 living with them, 62.4% were married couples living together, 7.5% had a female householder with no husband present, and 24.7% were non-families. 20.0% of all households were made up of individuals, and 7.2% had someone living alone who was 65 years of age or older.  The average household size was 2.62 and the average family size was 2.98.

In the township the population was spread out, with 26.0% under the age of 18, 7.0% from 18 to 24, 28.9% from 25 to 44, 26.6% from 45 to 64, and 11.4% who were 65 years of age or older.  The median age was 39 years. For every 100 females, there were 103.5 males.  For every 100 females age 18 and over, there were 104.2 males.

The median income for a household in the township was $41,983, and the median income for a family was $51,337. Males had a median income of $35,160 versus $25,436 for females. The per capita income for the township was $19,399.  About 6.8% of families and 6.8% of the population were below the poverty line, including 11.9% of those under age 18 and none of those age 65 or over.

References

External links
 Hope Township official website
 Early history of Hope Township

Townships in Barry County, Michigan
Grand Rapids metropolitan area
1850 establishments in Michigan
Populated places established in 1850
Townships in Michigan